was an early Japanese Christian convert of the 16th century, born in Kagoshima, and the first Japanese person to set foot in Europe. Bernardo was one of the first converts of Saint Francis Xavier, and one of his two disciples. Bernardo was baptized in 1549. He followed Xavier in Japan and India.

Biography
Bernardo left Japan for Portuguese India with Xavier in 1551, together with another Japanese person, Mathias, born in Yamaguchi. They arrived in India in February 1552. Mathias died in Goa however. Bernardo, with Brother Andreas Fernandes, then left for Portugal, where he arrived in 1553, with a letter written by Francis Xavier in Goa, dated 8 April 1552. The objective was for Bernardo "to see the Christian religion in all its majesty", so that he could share his experience back in Japan. In his letter, Xavier also commented that "Japanese intellect [was] as sharp and sensible as any in the world".

Bernardo is thought to have been the first Japanese person to set foot on European soil. In Portugal, Bernardo applied to and entered the Society of Jesus. He also studied at the College of Coimbra. 

After two years, Bernardo left to visit Rome on 17 July 1554, going through Spain to Barcelona, to take a ship to Naples. He was present in Rome during a period of 10 months. He met with Loyola and probably attended the election of Pope Marcellus II. Bernardo was highly valued, and gave great hope to the Papacy about the prospects of Catholicism in Japan.

Bernardo left Rome on 23 October 1555, and took a ship in Genoa. Bernardo died however upon his return to Portugal in February 1557.

See also
Tenshō embassy (1582)
William Adams, first Englishman who traveled to Japan (1600)
Hasekura Tsunenaga, who visited Europe from 1613 to 1620

Notes

1557 deaths
Japanese Roman Catholics
Converts to Roman Catholicism
University of Coimbra alumni
Year of birth unknown
Japanese expatriates in Portugal
Japan–Portugal relations
People from Kagoshima